Central Park is the premier urban park in Scunthorpe, Lincolnshire, England.

History

The park was opened as part of the Festival of Britain to celebrate the end of World War II. The children's play areas used to feature a steam locomotive and there was a paddling pool.

Location
North Lincolnshire Council, the owner, is based in the Civic Centre at the park and North Lindsey College is adjacent.

Facilities

There are formal gardens in front of the Civic Centre and a boulevard that is used by pedestrians and cyclists to cross the park between a leisure centre and North Lindsey College. There is a children's play area, cafe and a splashpad wet play area. The pods leisure centre is based at the park offering indoor sports and swimming pools. Scunthorpe Parkrun takes place in the park every Saturday morning at 9am, the run is 5km in length and mostly on the park's tarmac footpaths. The park won a Green Flag Award in 2017.

Fountain garden

The centre piece of the park is the fountain garden which is in the middle of a large green open space with footpaths and a variety of specimen trees and flowers.

References

Parks and open spaces in Lincolnshire
Scunthorpe